The 1920 South Dakota State Jackrabbits football team was an American football team that represented South Dakota State University as an independent during the 1920 college football season. In its second season under head coach Charles A. West, the team compiled a 4–2–1 record and outscored opponents by a total of 66 to 27.

Schedule

References

South Dakota State
South Dakota State Jackrabbits football seasons
South Dakota State Jackrabbits football